The 1979–80 Indiana Hoosiers men's basketball team represented Indiana University. Their head coach was Bobby Knight, who was in his 9th year. The team played its home games in Assembly Hall in Bloomington, Indiana, and was a member of the Big Ten Conference.

The Hoosiers finished the regular season with an overall record of 21–8 and a conference record of 13–5, finishing 1st in the Big Ten Conference. After missing out on the previous NCAA Tournament, IU was invited to participate in the 1980 NCAA tournament as a 2-seed; the Hoosiers advanced to the Sweet Sixteen, but they lost to the 6-seed Purdue Boilermakers.

Roster

Schedule/Results

|-
!colspan=8| Regular Season
|-

|-
!colspan=8| NCAA tournament

References

Indiana Hoosiers men's basketball seasons
Indiana
Indiana
Indiana Hoosiers
1980 in sports in Indiana